Gürsu is a village in the Sandıklı District, Afyonkarahisar Province, Turkey. Its population is 108 (2021).

References

Villages in Sandıklı District